Rocky Mountain House is a town in west-central Alberta, Canada. The surrounding Clearwater County's administration office is located in Rocky Mountain House.

History

The town has a long history dating to the 18th century with the presence of British and Canadian fur traders during the westward Canadian expansion. In 1799, the Hudson's Bay Company and the North West Company each established the Rocky Mountain House and Acton House fur trading posts. Trade with the local aboriginal peoples continued until 1821 when the companies merged, they continued to trade until 1875 and closed the Rocky Mountain House post. The name of the settlement however remained.

The Rocky Mountain House settlement also served as a launching point for many explorers such as David Thompson, in search for a passage west to the Pacific Ocean. Many travellers used this location as a stop on their way further west or northwest, just as they do into the 21st century.

The next wave of adventurers entered the region at the beginning of the 20th century in search of opportunities presented by lush farmland and the abundance of natural resources. Rocky Mountain House became a firmly established town by 1912.  Settlers of Scandinavian origin made up a significant part of early 20th century settlement in the region.

The town was hit by a magnitude 5.0 earthquake on October 20, 2021, just after 9:20pm MDT. It was the second-strongest earthquake in the province's history.

Fur trade 
Rocky Mountain House and Acton House were a pair of fur trade posts from 1799 to 1876. Rocky Mountain House belonged to the North West Company (NWC) and Acton House to the Hudson's Bay Company (HBC). When the two companies merged in 1821, the name Rocky Mountain House was retained. The posts were opened and closed seven times.

Rocky Mountain House was the westernmost post on the North Saskatchewan and was within sight of the Rocky Mountains. The fort facilitated trade with the Blackfeet and Piegans as well as the Kootenays across the mountains. The Kootenays were prevented from reaching Fort Edmonton by the Blackfeet and Piegans who wanted to profit as middlemen and keep them from getting guns. The fort also served as a base for finding a pass across the Rocky Mountains. The post also produced pemmican and York boats.

The posts were built at the confluence of the Clearwater River and the North Saskatchewan River. They were on the north bank just above the Clearwater and strongly built for protection from the Blackfeet. During low water there were rapids near the post. Around 1980, only two stone chimneys were standing. An interpretive centre was subsequently developed at this location.

Timeline 
1790:  Peter Pangman of the North West Company marked the site for the future company fort.
1799–1802: In September 1799, a group of Nor'Westers (North West Company employees) under John McDonald of Garth travelled upstream of Fort Augustus by canoe and horseback and established Rocky Mountain House. James Bird of the HBC followed and built Acton House. David Thompson and Duncan McGillivray of the NWC were wintering partners at their House. The Kootenays did not cross the mountains in significant numbers and attempts to find a pass failed. Therefore, both posts were closed in 1802.
1805–1807: The two posts were reopened without much success. In 1807, David Thompson of the NWC went up the North Saskatchewan, found Howse Pass and built Kootenay House on the Columbia River. The new post made Rocky Mountain House unnecessary and the posts were closed again in 1807.
1810–1812: Reopened in 1810, Alexander Henry 'The Younger' of the NWC found that the route over the mountains was blockaded by the Piegans. He and David Thompson set out overland north to the Athabasca River. After ascending it for five days, they abandoned their horses for snowshoes to cross Athabasca Pass for the first time and reached the Columbia River at Boat Encampment. Athabasca Pass was clearly superior and attempts to reach the Columbia shifted north. In 1811, a group of Gros Ventres planned to attack the fort but were threatened away by the Piegans who preferred to trade at Rocky Mountain House rather than at Fort Edmonton near their Cree enemies. The two posts were then closed to consolidate trade at Fort Edmonton.
1819–1823: Attempts to get the Blackfeet to trade at Fort Edmonton failed so the forts were reopened. With John Rowland in charge for the NWC, the two companies were merged in 1821 and the combined fort was called Rocky Mountain House. In 1823, George Simpson decided to close the post since there were few beaver and the post was losing money.
1825–1832: The post was reopened at Piegan request, and it prospered due to a new source of beaver. In the winter of 1830–31, a group of Piegans were attacked by the Crows, who killed 57 Piegans and stole all their furs. After this disaster and the opening of a closer American post, the Piegans stopped trading and the post was closed again in 1832.
1835–1861: A new post was built to the south somewhere on the Bow River in the Piegan country, which failed after two years. In 1835, J. E. Harriott built a new post down the river but in sight of the old post, where it remained as a wintering post for 26 years. The Piegan trade having been lost to the Americans, the HBC tried to concentrate the Blackfoot trade at Rocky Mountain House away from their enemies at Fort Edmonton. With the escalating violence on the frontier, the HBC decided to stop the liquor trade. In retaliation, the Blackfeet refused to trade and prevented buffalo hunters from leaving the fort. With starvation a real possibility, no one was sent upriver in the fall of 1861 to trade. Finding the fort empty, the Blackfeet burnt it to the ground.
1864–1876: Gold was discovered in Montana and the American traders shifted their attention from Indians to prospectors. The HBC reasoned that this made a new opportunity for the Indian trade and a new Rocky Mountain House was built next to the ruins of the old one. The trade did not prosper because the Blackfeet preferred the Americans' whiskey which they got from places like Fort Whoop-up. Arriving in 1874, the North-West Mounted Police drove out the American whiskey traders, and the HBC built a new post somewhere to the south making Rocky Mountain House redundant. It was closed permanently in 1876.

Geography
The North Saskatchewan River borders Rocky Mountain House to the west where the Clearwater River flows into the North Saskatchewan River.

Crimson Lake is home to Crimson Lake Provincial Park.

Climate

Rocky Mountain House has a subarctic climate (Köppen climate classification Dfc) that borders on a humid continental climate (Köppen Dfb). Daytime temperatures are in general representative for the latter, but the larger diurnal temperature variation with the high elevation ensures frequent frosts.

Demographics

In the 2016 Census of Population conducted by Statistics Canada, the Town of Rocky Mountain House recorded a population of 6,635 living in 2,599 of its 2,954 total private dwellings, a  change from its 2011 population of 6,933.

The Town of Rocky Mountain House's 2012 municipal census counted a population of 7,300, a 1.0% increase over its 2007 municipal census population of 7,231.

Economy
The economy of the Rocky Mountain House area is driven by petroleum, agriculture, and forestry. Tourism also plays a role in its economy due to its location at the crossroads of Highway 22 and Highway 11, and its location midway between Red Deer and the scenic Alberta's Rockies region.

Transportation
On the road, Rocky Mountain House is served by Highway 22 and Highway 11.

In the air, Rocky Mountain House is served by its airport.

Sports
The Recreation, Parks & Community Services Department hosts five annual sports tournaments. They include two slo-pitch, a sno-pitch, a volleyball and a hockey/slo-pitch combined tournament.

Government
Rocky Mountain House's town council consists of Mayor Debbie Baich and councillors Dave Auld, Marley Capraro, Shane Boniface, Len Phillips, and Tina Hutchinson .

Rocky Mountain House is located within the Rimbey-Rocky Mountain House-Sundre provincial electoral district, which is represented by Jason Nixon of the United Conservative Party.

Twin town
Rocky Mountain House is twinned with Kamikawa, Hokkaido, Japan.

See also
List of communities in Alberta
List of towns in Alberta
Saskatchewan River fur trade

References

External links

 
1913 establishments in Alberta
Forts or trading posts on the National Historic Sites of Canada register
Fur trade National Historic Sites of Canada
Hudson's Bay Company trading posts
National Historic Sites in Alberta
North West Company forts
Populated places on the North Saskatchewan River
Towns in Alberta